Oleszno may refer to the following places:
Oleszno, Greater Poland Voivodeship (west-central Poland)
Oleszno, Kuyavian-Pomeranian Voivodeship (north-central Poland)
Oleszno, Świętokrzyskie Voivodeship (south-central Poland)
Oleszno, West Pomeranian Voivodeship (north-west Poland)